Město Touškov is a town in Plzeň-North District in the Plzeň Region of the Czech Republic. It has about 2,200 inhabitants. The town centre is well preserved and is protected by law as an urban monument zone.

Administrative parts
The village of Kůští is an administrative part of Město Touškov. It forms an exclave of the municipal territory.

Geography
It lies in the Plasy Uplands.

Notable people
Simon von Lämel (1766–1845), Austrian-Jewish merchant

References

External links

Cities and towns in the Czech Republic
Holocaust locations
Jewish communities in the Czech Republic
Jewish Czech history
Populated places in Plzeň-North District
Shtetls